KZCT (89.5 FM) is a radio station in Vallejo, California founded in 2006 by David Martin and Katie Martinelli.
 The station broadcasts a variety of community content including rap, reggae, classical, jazz, poetry, religious programming and sports. Notable artists who have appeared on KZCT since its inception include H.E.R., Nef the Pharaoh, Nina Serrano, and D.L. Lang. It has a silent disco party bus it dubs the Twerkulator.

See also
List of community radio stations in the United States

References

External links
 

Community radio stations in the United States
Mass media in Vallejo, California
ZCT